This is the List of highest mountains of the Czech Republic.

Most of them are located at Giant Mountains, Hrubý Jeseník and Bohemian Forest mountain ranges. Other mountain ranges with mountains over 1,000 m that are not included in this general list are shown in additional tables.

All Czech mountain ranges are located along the borders to neighbouring Austria, Slovakia, Poland and Germany.

The information was obtained from "Mountains in Czech Republic over one thousand meters above sea“  and "Peakclimber“.

Location of mountain ranges with summits above 1000 m

The highest mountains of the Czech Republic

Further mountain ranges with mountains above 1000 m

Orlické hory

Bohemian Forest Foothills

Ore Mountains

Gratzen Mountains

Hanušovice Highlands

Hostýn-Vsetín Mountains

Jizera Mountains

Ještěd–Kozákov Ridge

Moravian-Silesian Beskids

Upper Palatine Forest

Golden Mountains

References

 
Czech Republic
Czech Republic
Mountains